Clayton Lee Harbor (born July 2, 1987) is a former American football tight end and current television personality. He was drafted by the Philadelphia Eagles in the fourth round of the 2010 NFL Draft. He played college football at Missouri State. He has also been a member of the Jacksonville Jaguars, New England Patriots, Detroit Lions and New Orleans Saints.

Early years
Harbor is the son of Jeff Harbor and Donna Norman. He grew up in Dwight, Illinois and attended Dwight High School, which had a graduating class of only 74 during Harbor's senior year. He was a four-year letterman in football, basketball, and track. In his final three seasons, he earned All-Interstate 8 Conference honors in each sport. In football, Harbor played wide receiver and safety, and broke the school record with 60 receptions, 1,079 yards, and 19 touchdowns.

Harbor was not offered a scholarship in football, and decided to try and earn a basketball scholarship until he sustained an injury during his senior basketball season. Harbor's brother Cory, who played linebacker for the Missouri State Bears, persuaded the coaches at Missouri State to give Harbor a chance, and he was offered a scholarship.

College career
During his freshman year at Missouri State, Harbor was redshirted. The following year, as a redshirt freshman, he played in 11 games, starting two of the eleven at wide receiver. He caught six passes for 73 yards in 2006. His best game that season was in a win against Southwest Baptist University (of the NAIA), in which he recorded three receptions for 34 yards, including a touchdown. He also caught a 31-yard pass against Oklahoma State.

Harbor switched positions as a redshirt sophomore in 2007, moving from wide receiver to tight end. Against Southern Illinois, he caught seven passes for 87 yards. He made five receptions for 106 yards against Indiana State University, and he set school records for receptions and yards in a single season as a tight end with 45 receptions and 647 yards. Following the season, he earned Associated Press third-team All-America and first-team All-Missouri Valley Football Conference (MVFC) honors. As a sophomore, he was named Missouri State's offensive player of the year.

As a junior, he led the Bears with 40 receptions for 457 yards. He earned second-team Associated Press All-America honors after the season. By the end of his junior season, he kept his streak alive of 22 consecutive games with a reception. Twice he earned Missouri State University Coors Player of the Week in his junior season. He also broke the 1,000 career receiving yard mark on his way to receive first-team All-MVFC honors for the second straight year as well as Missouri State's Offensive Player of the Year.

As a senior, he tallied 59 receptions, which was second-most in the nation among tight ends, with 729 yards. He was first among tight ends in receiving yards per game with 66.3 yards. He ended his career as the all-time receptions leader at Missouri State with 150 as well as third in receiving yards with 1,906. Following the season, he earned Football Championship Subdivision first-team All-America honors and first-team All-MVFC honors for the third straight year. He was also placed on the MVFC All-Silver Anniversary Squad.

Professional career
Harbor was one of 20 players selected to participate in the NFL Scouting Combine from the FCS or a lower division. Among tight ends, he finished first in the bench press with 30 repetitions of 225 pounds, second in the vertical jump with 40 inches, and fourth in the 40-yard dash with 4.62 seconds.

Philadelphia Eagles
Harbor was selected by the Philadelphia Eagles in the fourth round of the 2010 NFL Draft with the 125th overall pick. He was signed to a four-year contract worth $2.243 million with $453,000 guaranteed on June 15, 2010. In 2010, he recorded nine receptions for 72 yards and one touchdown. Against the San Francisco 49ers as a rookie, he caught three passes for 55 yards and had a touchdown reception. Harbor was released by the team on August 31, 2013.

Jacksonville Jaguars
Harbor was claimed off waivers by the Jacksonville Jaguars on September 1, 2013. He played all 16 games in the 2013 season for the Jaguars, catching 24 passes for 292 yards, and scoring two touchdowns.

New England Patriots
On March 30, 2016 Harbor signed with the New England Patriots. On October 3, 2016, he was released by the Patriots.

Detroit Lions
On October 4, 2016, Harbor was signed by the Lions.

New Orleans Saints
On May 14, 2017, Harbor was signed by the New Orleans Saints. He was placed on injured reserve on August 28, 2017.

Team 9
Harbor signed with the XFL's Team 9 practice squad on March 10, 2020. He had his contract terminated when the league suspended operations on April 10, 2020.

Reality television
Harbor was a contestant on the 14th season of The Bachelorette, starring Rebecca "Becca" Kufrin, in 2018. Harbor, however, left the show after injuring his wrist while playing tackle football with the other contestants. The injury required surgery.

He was on the sixth season of Bachelor in Paradise in 2019.

References

External links

Philadelphia Eagles bio

1987 births
Living people
People from Dwight, Illinois
Players of American football from Illinois
American football tight ends
Missouri State Bears football players
Philadelphia Eagles players
Jacksonville Jaguars players
New England Patriots players
Detroit Lions players
New Orleans Saints players
Bachelor Nation contestants
Team 9 players